Narko is a rural locality in the Toowoomba Region, Queensland, Australia.

History 
The locality takes its name from a former railway station, named on 9 January 1915 by the Queensland Railways Department using an Aboriginal word meaning good soil.

References 

Toowoomba Region
Localities in Queensland